The 2015 Southeastern Conference baseball tournament was held from May 19 through 24 at Hoover Metropolitan Stadium in Hoover, Alabama.  The annual tournament determined the tournament champion of the Division I Southeastern Conference in college baseball.  Florida, the tournament champion, earned the conference's automatic bid to the 2015 NCAA Division I baseball tournament.

The tournament has been held every year since 1977, with LSU claiming eleven championships, the most of any school.  Original members Georgia and Kentucky along with 1993 addition Arkansas have never won the tournament.  This is the eighteenth consecutive year and twentieth overall that the event has been held at Hoover Metropolitan Stadium.

Format and seeding
The regular season division winners, LSU and Vanderbilt, claimed the top two seeds respectively and the next ten teams by conference winning percentage, regardless of division, will claim the remaining berths in the tournament.  The bottom eight teams played a single-elimination opening round, followed by a double-elimination format until the semifinals, when the format reverted to single elimination through the championship game. This was the third year of this format. Auburn was seeded ninth ahead of South Carolina due of the tiebreaker they obtained by winning a regular season series against the Gamecocks in Columbia.

Bracket

Schedule

All-Tournament Team
The following players were named to the All-Tournament Team.

Bold is MVP.

References

Tournament
Southeastern Conference Baseball Tournament
Southeastern Conference baseball tournament
Southeastern Conference baseball tournament
College sports tournaments in Alabama
Baseball competitions in Hoover, Alabama